Jean-Claude Fernandes (born 8 November 1972) is a French professional football manager, executive, and former player. As of August 2022, he is the sporting director of Championnat National 2 club Sainte-Geneviève.

Playing career

Paris Saint-Germain 
At the age of 14, Fernandes joined Paris Saint-Germain (PSG). He turned down moves to Saint-Étienne, Auxerre, Lille, Nantes, and RC Paris in order to stay closer to his parents, and because he was a supporter of PSG.

On 11 August 1993, Fernandes made his first and only appearance for PSG in a 1–0 win against Sochaux. PSG won the Division 1 in 1993–94, therefore Fernandes had the title attributed to him in his career honours, despite not playing an full match the entire season.

During the 1995–96 season, Fernandes went on loan to Nancy in the Division 2. He played frequently in his first season under manager László Bölöni, and stayed at the club the following year. In the beginning of the 1995–96 season, Fernandes injured his knee. He was back at playing football after four months on the sidelines, but only made a total of 13 appearances that campaign before leaving the club.

Châteauroux 
After leaving Nancy, Fernandes went back to Paris Saint-Germain, only to sign for Châteauroux one weekend before the closing of the transfer market. In his first season with the club, he played a total of 24 matches across all competitions as Châteauroux won the Division 2.

Châteauroux played in the Division 1 in the 1997–98 season, but were relegated. Fernandes did not play a single match due to injury; he had surgery three times on his knee. After failed transfers to Sedan and Pisa due to injury, Fernandes decided to end his professional career.

Sainte-Geneviève 
In December 1998, Fernandes joined amateur club Sainte-Geneviève, where his brother was playing. He became player-manager for the club in June 2002, and retired from football two years later.

Post-playing career 
In 2004, Fernandes stopped playing football altogether. He took the full job of manager at Sainte-Geneviève after being player-manager for the previous two seasons. In 2007, Fernandes left his position as head coach to become the coordinator of the club. Fernandes stayed in this role for a year before becoming sporting director of Sainte-Geneviève Sports in 2008. He works with former Paris Saint-Germain teammate Emmanuel Dorado, who is the manager at the club.

Back in 2007, while being the coordinator of Sainte-Geneviève Sports, Fernandes worked in parallel for the city of Sainte-Geneviève-des-Bois. He was responsible for services of transport, and had twenty persons working under his responsibility.

Career statistics

Honours 
Paris Saint-Germain U19

 Coupe Gambardella: 1990–91

Paris Saint-Germain
 Division 1: 1993–94

Châteauroux
 Division 2: 1996–97

References 

Living people
1972 births
People from Longjumeau
Association football midfielders
French footballers
French people of Portuguese descent
France youth international footballers
Paris Saint-Germain F.C. players
Sainte-Geneviève Sports players
AS Nancy Lorraine players
LB Châteauroux players
Ligue 1 players
Ligue 2 players
French football managers
Division d'Honneur players
Championnat National 3 players
FC Morangis-Chilly players
Footballers from Essonne
Sainte-Geneviève Sports non-playing staff